Liotinaria scalarioides is a species of sea snail, a marine gastropod mollusk, in the family Liotiidae.

Description
The length of the shell attains 15.4 mm.

Distribution
This marine species occurs off the Philippines.

References

External links
 Reeve, L. A. (1843). Monograph of the genus Delphinula. In: Conchologia iconica, or, illustrations of the shells of molluscous animals, vol. 1., pls 1-5 and unpaginated text. L. Reeve & Co., London

Liotiidae